All Routes under 100 were renumbered in the 1970s. Some are now Routes in the 100-range; others became Autoroutes. Autoroutes are numbered under 100 and above 400, and the conflicting range was changed.

History 
Prior to the early the 1970s, Quebec's provincial routes were numbered from 1-108. With the development and subsequent expansion of the Autoroute system, as well as an effort to simplify route connections and reduce motorist confusion. First proposed in 1966 with the intent of being implemented for Expo 67, the changes did not occur until the early 1970s. As part of the renumbering, the present blue Autoroute and green Provincial highway shields were introduced.

Former route list 

 , from Montreal to Quebec City, via Sherbrooke, now Route 112 and Route 171.
 , Rivière-Beaudette to Dégelis. Originally part of an interprovincial Route 2 that connected Ontario (ON Highway 2) to New Brunswick (NB Route 2), and further to Nova Scotia (Trunk 2).
 , now Route 230.
 , now Autoroute 520 in Montreal.
 , now Route 138 in Quebec City.
 , now Route 132 between New York State and Levis.
 , now Route 201.
  from New York State to Montreal, the routing of Route 138 south of the Saint Lawrence River.
 , now Route 143 and Route 116 from Stanstead to Quebec City; originally a continuation of US 5.
 , now Route 132 around the Gaspe Peninsula.
 , now Route 197.
 , now Route 133, Route 104 and Route 112 from Vermont (Interstate 89) to Montreal (Victoria Bridge); originally a continuation of US 7.
 , now Route 148 from Laval to Gatineau.
 , now Route 344 from the Grenville Interprovincial Bridge to Route 148.
 , from New York State to Montreal, extending US 9 along present Autoroute 15 right of way, then to Quebec City following Autoroute 20.
 , now Route 221 and Route 217. While the number may suggest a continuation of New York State Route 9A, that road never existed on the US side in that part of New York State.
 , now Route 223, Route 104 and Route 134; originally a continuation of New York Route 9B
 , now Route 132.
 , now a section of Route 132 between Rivière-du-Loup and Matane.
 , now a section of Route 117, and Route 105.
 , now Route 117.
 , now Route 233 and Route 137.
 , now Route 139, Route 143, Autoroute 20 and former Route 155.
 , now Route 201.
 , now Route 138.
 , now Route 362.
 , now Route 360.
 , now Route 170 and Route 372.
 , now Route 170.
 , now partly Autoroute 40, Route 342, and Autoroute 20 into Montreal; originally a continuation of Ontario Highway 17.
 , now Autoroute 25/Route 125.
 , now Route 155.
 , now Route 159.
 , now Route 153.
 , now Route 122.
 , now Route 133.
 , now Route 147, Route 143 and Route 122.
 , now Route 173.
 , now Route 204.
 , now Route 281.
 , now Route 279.
 , now Route 283.
 , now Route 253.
 , now Route 210.
 , now Route 108.
 , now Route 344.
 , now Route 329.
 , now Route 327.
  now Route 116 and Route 255.
 , now Route 341.
 , now Route 161.
 , now Route 309.
 , now Route 205, Route 209 and Route 219.
  now local roads in Montreal. It ran around the perimeter of the Island of Montreal. 
 , now local roads in Laval. It ran around the perimeter of Île Jésus.
 , now Route 243.
 , now Route 104.
 , now Route 104.
 , now Route 158.
 , now Route 158, Route 343 and Route 347.
 , now Route 347 and Route 131.
 , now Route 348.
 , now Route 349.
 , now Route 386 and Route 111.
 , now Route 101.
 , now Route 223.
 , now Route 343 and Route 131.
 , now Route 218, Route 265 and Route 165.
 , now Route 141.
 , now Route 289.
 , now Route 202.
 , now Route 277.
 , now Route 175.
 , now Route 169.
 , now Boulevard Henri-Bourassa and Boulevard Talbot in Quebec City.
 , now 1re Avenue in Quebec City.
 , now Route 169 around Lac Saint-Jean.
 , now Route 381.
 , now Route 323.
 , now Route 117 and Route 113.
 , now Route 117.
 , now Route 111.
 , now Route 109.
 , now Route 382.
 , now Route 393.
 , now Route 397.
 , now Route 335.
 , now Route 225.
 , now Chemin de la Vallée-Missisquoi. A continuation of Vermont Route 105A. There was never a Route 105 under the old system.
 , now Route 237. A continuation of Vermont Route 108.

See also 
 List of Quebec provincial highways

References 

Quebec provincial highways